1982–1992 is a compilation album by the Swedish band Europe, released in 1993 by Epic Records. Vocalist Joey Tempest chose the songs for this album. The album reached the top 10 in France compilation charts in April 1993. 

This album contains some rarities, such as "On Broken Wings", which was the B-side for the "Final Countdown" single, and two songs from the Prisoners in Paradise sessions: "Sweet Love Child" and "Yesterday's News".

The album was reissued in 2000 as 1982–2000, including the bonus track "The Final Countdown 2000" - despite negative comment on the remix from some of the band's members.

Track listing

Personnel 
Joey Tempest – Vocals, acoustic guitar, keyboards (All tracks)
John Norum – Guitars, background vocals (Tracks 1–11)
Kee Marcello – Guitars, background vocals (Tracks 12–17)
John Levén – Bass (All tracks)
Mic Michaeli – Keyboards, background vocals (Tracks 7–17)
Tony Reno – Drums (Tracks 1–6)
Ian Haugland – Drums, background vocals (Tracks 7–17)
Nate Winger – Background vocals (Tracks 14, 16–17)
Paul Winger – Background vocals (Tracks 14, 16–17)
Joey Tempest – Compilation producer
Thomas Witt – Compilation producer
Peter Dahl –  Remastering, digital remastering
Annmarie Gatti – Coordination
Michael Johansson – Photography
Denis O'Regan – Photography
Per Hökengren – Artwork

References

External links

Europe (band) compilation albums
1993 greatest hits albums
Epic Records compilation albums